Alla mia cara mamma nel giorno del suo compleanno (To my dear mother on the day of her birthday) is a 1974 Italian comedy drama film directed by Luciano Salce.

Plot 
The young noble Didino is a big baby and an introvert man who has trouble to socializing because of the possessive mother. He is still treated in thirty years as a kid and does not know what to do to overcome his shyness, because no one of his family listens to him, and his uncle, worsening the situation, believes that he is mentally ill and also homosexual. By mistake the old servant of the family dies in an accident at home, so the mother of Didino calls a new scullery maid: a beautiful girl who falls in love with Didino. He too feels love for her, but does not know how to react because he is afraid that the mother can punish severely him. Initially Didino manages to overcome the fears and also design the flight home with the maid. The mother agrees and one evening in tears, begging her son to grant to him the last bath. This is a pretext of the mother to drown her son, so she can stay with him forever, even after death. While Didino dies drowned the servant under the house waits in tears for his arrival ...

Cast 

Paolo Villaggio: Count Fernando aka "Didino"
Lila Kedrova: Countess Mafalda
Eleonora Giorgi: Angela
Jimmy il Fenomeno: Savior
Antonino Faà di Bruno: Uncle Alberto
Renato Chiantoni: Anchise
Orchidea De Santis: Jolanda
: Driade
Guido Cerniglia:Cesarino

References

External links

1974 films
Italian comedy-drama films
Films directed by Luciano Salce
Commedia all'italiana
1974 comedy-drama films
Films scored by Franco Micalizzi
1970s Italian-language films
1970s Italian films